Leptocleidia is a clade of plesiosauroids. The group was erected in 2007 as Leptocleidoidea. Although established as a clade, the name Leptocleidoidea implies that it is a superfamily. Leptocleidoidea is placed within the superfamily Plesiosauroidea, so it was renamed Leptocleidia by Hilary F. Ketchum and Roger B. J. Benson (2010) to avoid confusion with ranks. Leptocleidia is a node-based taxon which was defined by Ketchum and Benson as "Leptocleidus superstes, Polycotylus latipinnis, their most recent common ancestor and all of its descendants".

References

Plesiosaurs
Fossil taxa described in 2010